Roland Becker (born August 25, 1940) is a German politician of the Christian Democratic Union (CDU) and former member of the German Bundestag.

Life 
Becker joined the GDR CDU in 1971, for which he sat in the District Assembly in Leipzig from 1973 to 1990 and in the Leipzig Southwest District Assembly from 1974 to 1979. In 1990 he was a member of the last Volkskammer and until December of the German Bundestag.

Literature

References

1940 births

Members of the Bundestag for Saxony
Members of the Bundestag 1987–1990
Members of the Bundestag for the Christian Democratic Union of Germany
Members of the 10th Volkskammer
Living people